Macadamia is a genus of four species of trees in the flowering plant family Proteaceae. They are indigenous to Australia, native to northeastern New South Wales and central and southeastern Queensland specifically. Two species of the genus are commercially important for their fruit, the macadamia nut  (or simply macadamia). Other names include Queensland nut, bush nut, maroochi nut, bauple nut and, in the USA, they are also erroneously known as Hawaii nut. In Australian Aboriginal languages, the fruit is known by names such as bauple, gyndl or jindilli (north of Great Dividing Range) and boombera (south of the Great Range). It was an important source of bushfood for the Aboriginal peoples who are the original inhabitants of the area.

The nut was first commercially produced on a wide scale in Hawaii, where Australian seeds were introduced in the 1880s, and for some time, they were the world's largest producer. South Africa has been the world's largest producer of the macadamia since the 2010s.

Etymology
The German-Australian botanist Ferdinand von Mueller gave the genus the name Macadamia in 1857 in honour of the Scottish-Australian chemist, medical teacher, and politician John Macadam, who was the honorary Secretary of the Philosophical Institute of Victoria beginning in 1857.

Description

The fruit is a hard, woody, globose follicle with a pointed apex containing one or two seeds. The nutshell ("coat") is particularly tough and requires around 2000 N to crack. The shell material is five times harder than hazelnut shells and has mechanical properties similar to aluminum. It has a Vickers hardness of 35.

Modern history
1828
Allan Cunningham was the first European to encounter the macadamia plant in Australia.
1857 - 1858
German-Australian botanist Ferdinand von Mueller gave the genus the scientific name Macadamia. He named it after his friend John Macadam, a noted scientist and secretary of the Philosophical Institute of Australia.
1858
'Bauple nuts' were discovered in Bauple, Queensland; they are now known as macadamia nuts.
Walter Hill, superintendent of the Brisbane Botanic Gardens (Australia), observed a boy eating the kernel without ill effect, becoming the first nonindigenous person recorded to eat macadamia nuts.
1860s
King Jacky, aboriginal elder of the Logan River clan, south of Brisbane, Queensland, was the first known macadamia entrepreneur in his tribe and he regularly collected and traded the macadamias with settlers.
1866
 Tom Petrie planted macadamias at Yebri Creek (near Petrie) from nuts obtained from Aboriginals at Buderim. 
1882
William H. Purvis introduced macadamia nuts to Hawaii as a windbreak for sugar cane.
1888
The first commercial orchard of macadamias was planted at Rous Mill, 12 km from Lismore, New South Wales, by Charles Staff.
1889
Joseph Maiden, an Australian botanist, wrote, "It is well worth extensive cultivation, for the nuts are always eagerly bought."
1910
The Hawaiian Agricultural Experiment Station encouraged the planting of macadamias on Hawaii's Kona District as a crop to supplement coffee production in the region.
1916
Tom Petrie begins trial macadamia plantations in Maryborough, Queensland, combining macadamias with pecans to shelter the trees.
1922
Ernest van Tassel formed the Hawaiian Macadamia Nut Co. in Hawaii.
1925
Tassel leased  on Round Top in Honolulu and began Nutridge, Hawaii's first macadamia seed farm.
1931
Tassel established a macadamia-processing factory on Puhukaina Street in Kakaako, Hawaii, selling the nuts as Van's Macadamia Nuts.
1937
Winston Jones and J. H. Beaumont of the University of Hawaii's Agricultural Experiment Station reported the first successful grafting of macadamias, paving the way for mass production.
1946
A large plantation was established in Hawaii.
1953
Castle & Cooke added a new brand of macadamia nuts called "Royal Hawaiian," which was credited with popularizing the nuts in the U.S.
1991
A fourth macadamia species, Macadamia jansenii, was described, being first brought to the attention of plant scientists in 1983 by Ray Jansen, a sugarcane farmer and amateur botanist from South Kolan in Central Queensland.
1997
Australia surpassed the United States as the major producer of macadamias.
2012–2015
South Africa surpassed Australia as the largest producer of macadamias.
2014 
The manner in which macadamia nuts were served on Korean Air Flight 86 from John F. Kennedy International Airport in New York City led to a "nut rage incident", which gave the nuts high visibility in South Korea and marked a sharp increase in consumption there.

Species
 Macadamia integrifolia 
 Macadamia jansenii  
 Macadamia ternifolia 
 Macadamia tetraphylla 

Nuts from M. jansenii and M. ternifolia contain cyanogenic glycosides. The other two species are cultivated for the commercial production of macadamia nuts for human consumption.

Previously, more species with disjunct distributions were named as members of this genus Macadamia. Genetics and morphological studies published in 2008 show they have separated from the genus Macadamia, correlating less closely than thought from earlier morphological studies. The species previously named in the genus Macadamia may still be referred to overall by the descriptive, non-scientific name of macadamia.

Formerly included in the genus
Lasjia , formerly Macadamia until 2008
 Lasjia claudiensis ; synonym, base name: Macadamia claudiensis 
 Lasjia erecta ; synonym, base name: Macadamia erecta A tree endemic to the island of Sulawesi, Indonesia. First described by science in 1995.
 Lasjia grandis ; synonym, base name: Macadamia grandis 
 Lasjia hildebrandii ; synonym, base name: Macadamia hildebrandii Another species endemic to Sulawesi.
 Lasjia whelanii ; synonyms: base name: Helicia whelanii , Macadamia whelanii 

Catalepidia , formerly Macadamia until 1995
Catalepidia heyana ; synonyms: base name: Helicia heyana  , Macadamia heyana 

Virotia , formerly Macadamia until the first species renaming began in 1975 and comprehensive in 2008
Virotia angustifolia ; synonym, base name: Macadamia angustifolia 
Virotia francii ; synonym, base name: Roupala francii 
Virotia leptophylla  (1975 type species); synonym, base name: Kermadecia leptophylla  
Virotia neurophylla ; synonyms: base name: Kermadecia neurophylla , Macadamia neurophylla 
Virotia rousselii ; synonym, base name: Roupala rousselii 
Virotia vieillardi ; synonym, base name: Roupala vieillardii

Cultivation

The macadamia tree is usually propagated by grafting and does not begin to produce commercial quantities of seeds until it is 7–10 years old, but once established, it may continue bearing for over 100 years. The roots are shallow, and trees can be blown down in storms; like most Proteaceae, they are also susceptible to Phytophthora root disease. As of 2019, the macadamia nut is the most expensive nut in the world, which is attributed to the slow harvesting process.

Cultivars

Beaumont
A Macadamia integrifolia / M. tetraphylla hybrid commercial variety is widely planted in Australia and New Zealand; Dr. J. H. Beaumont discovered it. It is high in oil but is not sweet. New leaves are reddish, and flowers are bright pink, borne on long racemes. It is one of the quickest varieties to come into bearing once planted in the garden, usually carrying a useful crop by the fourth year and improving from then on. It crops prodigiously when well pollinated. The impressive, grape-like clusters are sometimes so heavy they break the branchlets to which they are attached. On the downside, the macadamias do not drop from the tree when ripe, and the leaves are a bit prickly when one reaches into the tree's interior during harvest. Its shell is easier to open than that of most commercial varieties.

Maroochy
A pure M. tetraphylla variety from Australia, this strain is cultivated for its productive crop yield, flavor, and suitability for pollinating 'Beaumont.'

Nelmac II
A South African M. integrifolia / M. tetraphylla hybrid cultivar, it has a sweet seed, which means it has to be cooked carefully so that the sugars do not caramelise. The sweet seed is usually not fully processed, as it generally does not taste as good, but many people enjoy eating it uncooked. It has an open micropyle (hole in the shell), which may let in fungal spores. The crack-out percentage (ratio of nut meat to the whole nut by weight) is high. It is a popular variety because of its pollination of 'Beaumont,' and the yields are almost comparable.

Renown
A M. integrifolia / M. tetraphylla hybrid, this is a rather spreading tree. On the plus side, it is high yielding commercially;  from a 9-year-old tree has been recorded, and the nuts drop to the ground. However, they are thick-shelled, with not much flavor.

Production
In 2018, South Africa was estimated as the leading producer of macadamia nuts, with 54,000 tonnes out of global production of 211,000 tonnes. Macadamia is commercially produced in many countries of Southeast Asia, South America, Australia, and North America having Mediterranean, temperate or tropical climates.

History
Besides the development of a small boutique industry in Australia during the late 19th and early 20th centuries, macadamia was extensively planted as a commercial crop in Hawaii from the 1920s onward. Macadamia seeds were first imported into Hawaii in 1882 by William H. Purvis, who planted seeds that year at Kapulena. The Hawaiian-produced macadamia established the well-known seed internationally, and in 2017, Hawaii produced over 22,000 tonnes.

In 2019, researchers collected samples from hundreds of trees in Queensland and compared their genetic profiles to samples from Hawaiian orchards. They determined that essentially all the Hawaiian trees must have descended from a small population of Australian trees from Gympie, possibly just a single tree. This lack of genetic diversity in the commercial crop puts it at risk of succumbing to pathogens (as has happened in the past to banana cultivars). Growers may seek to diversify the cultivated population by hybridizing with wild specimens.

Nutrition
Raw macadamia nuts are 1% water, 14% carbohydrates, 76% fat, and 8% protein (table). A 100-gram reference amount of macadamia nuts provides 740 kilocalories and are a rich source (20% or more of the Daily Value (DV)) of numerous essential nutrients, including thiamine (104% DV), vitamin B6 (21% DV), other B vitamins, manganese (195% DV), iron (28% DV), magnesium (37% DV) and phosphorus (27% DV) (table).

Compared with other common edible nuts, such as almonds and cashews, macadamias are high in total fat and relatively low in protein. They have a high amount of monounsaturated fats (59% of total content) and contain, as 17% of total fat, the monounsaturated fat, omega-7 palmitoleic acid.

Toxicity in dogs
Macadamias are toxic to dogs. Ingestion may result in macadamia toxicity marked by weakness and hind limb paralysis with the inability to stand, occurring within 12 hours of ingestion. It is not known what makes macadamia nuts toxic, but its effects have only been reported in dogs. Depending on the quantity ingested and the size of the dog, symptoms may also include muscle tremors, joint pain, and severe abdominal pain. In high doses of toxin, opiate medication may be required for symptom relief until the toxic effects diminish, with full recovery usually within 24 to 48 hours.

Other uses
The trees are also grown as ornamental plants in subtropical regions for their glossy foliage and attractive flowers. The flowers produce a well-regarded honey. The wood is used decoratively for small items.
Macadamia species are used as food plants by the larvae of some Lepidoptera species, including Batrachedra arenosella.

Macadamia seeds are often fed to hyacinth macaws in captivity. These large parrots are one of the few animals, aside from humans, capable of cracking the shell and removing the seed.

See also
Macadamia oil

References

 
Australian cuisine
Cuisine of Brisbane
Edible nuts and seeds
Fruit trees
Proteaceae genera
Hawaiian cuisine
Proteales of Australia
Endemic flora of Australia